Group B of the 2015 Fed Cup Europe/Africa Zone Group II was one of two pools in the Europe/Africa zone of the 2015 Fed Cup. Four teams competed in a round robin competition, with the top team and the bottom team proceeding to their respective sections of the play-offs: the top team played for advancement to Group I, while the bottom team faced potential relegation to Group III.

Standings

Round-robin

Finland vs. Ireland

Slovenia vs. Luxembourg

Finland vs. Slovenia

Ireland vs. Luxembourg

Slovenia vs. Ireland

Finland vs. Luxembourg

References

External links 
 Fed Cup website

B2